Dominick John Dunne (October 29, 1925 – August 26, 2009) was an American writer, investigative journalist, and producer. He began his career in film and television as a producer of the pioneering gay film The Boys in the Band (1970) and as the producer of the award-winning drug film The Panic in Needle Park (1971). He turned to writing in the early 1970s. After the 1982 murder of his daughter Dominique, an actress, he began to write about the interaction of wealth and high society with the judicial system. Dunne was a frequent contributor to Vanity Fair, and, beginning in the 1980s, often appeared on television discussing crime.

Early life
Dunne was born in 1925 in Hartford, Connecticut, the second of six children of Richard Edwin Dunne, a hospital chief of staff and a heart surgeon, and Dorothy Frances (née Burns). His maternal grandfather, Dominick Francis Burns (1857–1940), was a successful grocer, who, in 1919, co-founded the Park Street Trust Company, a neighborhood savings bank. Although his Irish Catholic family was affluent, Dunne recalled feeling like an outsider in the predominantly WASP West Hartford suburb where he grew up.

As a boy, Dunne was known as Nicky. He attended the Kingswood School and the Canterbury School in New Milford, Connecticut, but was drafted into the Army during his senior year of high school. Dunne served in World War II and received the Bronze Star for heroism during the Battle of Metz. After the war, he attended Williams College, from which he graduated in 1949.

Dunne was the older brother of writer John Gregory Dunne (1932–2003), a screenwriter and a critic who married the writer Joan Didion. The brothers wrote a column for The Saturday Evening Post and they also collaborated on the production of The Panic in Needle Park. Didion and John Gregory Dunne wrote the screenplay, while Dominick Dunne produced the film (which featured Al Pacino in his first leading role).

Career

After graduating from Williams College, Dunne moved to New York City, where he became a stage manager for television. Later, Humphrey Bogart brought him to Hollywood to work on the television version of The Petrified Forest. Dunne worked on Playhouse 90 and became vice president of Four Star Television. He frequently socialized with members of Hollywood's elite, including Elizabeth Montgomery and Elizabeth Taylor, but in 1979, beset with addictions, he left Hollywood and moved to rural Oregon. There, he said, he overcame his personal demons and wrote his first book, The Two Mrs. Grenvilles.

In November 1982, his daughter, Dominique Dunne, best known for her part in the film Poltergeist, was murdered by strangulation. Dominick Dunne attended the trial of John Thomas Sweeney, Dominique's ex-boyfriend. Sweeney was convicted of voluntary manslaughter and sentenced to six and a half years in prison, but he only served two and a half years of his sentence. Dunne's article "Justice: A Father's Account of the Trial of his Daughter's Killer" ran in the March 1984 issue of Vanity Fair.

Dunne started writing regularly for Vanity Fair. He based several bestselling novels on real events, including the murders of Alfred Bloomingdale's mistress, Vicki Morgan (An Inconvenient Woman), and banking heir William Woodward, Jr., who was shot by his wife, Ann Woodward (The Two Mrs. Grenvilles). He eventually hosted the TV series Dominick Dunne's Power, Privilege, and Justice on Court TV (later truTV), in which he discussed the justice and injustice of the intersection of celebrity and the judicial system. He covered the famous trials of O. J. Simpson, Claus von Bülow, Michael Skakel, William Kennedy Smith, and the Menendez brothers. The Library of America selected Dunne's account of the Menendez trial, Nightmare on Elm Drive, for inclusion in its two-century retrospective of American true crime writing, published in 2008.

In 2005, former California Congressman Gary Condit won an undisclosed financial settlement and an apology from Dunne, who had earlier implicated him in the disappearance of Condit's intern Chandra Levy in Washington, D.C. Levy was from Condit's Congressional district, and Condit had previously admitted to an extramarital affair with her. As part of the settlement, Dunne issued a brief statement that it was not his intention “to imply that Mr. Condit was complicit in Levy’s disappearance." In November 2006, Condit again sued Dunne for comments Dunne made about him on Larry King Live on CNN. This lawsuit was eventually dismissed.

Throughout his life, Dunne frequently socialized with, wrote about, and was photographed with celebrities. Sean Elder's review of Dunne's memoir, The Way We Lived Then, recounted how Dunne appeared at a wedding reception for Dennis Hopper, writing, "But in the midst of it all, there was one man who was getting what ceramic artist Ron Nagle would call 'the full cheese,' one guy everyone gravitated toward and paid obeisance to." That man was Dunne, who mixed easily with artists, actors, and writers present at the function. Dunne was quoted as saying that Hopper wished he "had a picture of myself with Allen Ginsberg and Norman Mailer."

In 2008, at age 82, Dunne traveled from New York to Las Vegas to cover O. J. Simpson's trial on charges of kidnapping and armed robbery for Vanity Fair. He said it would be his last such assignment. Having reported on Simpson's first trial and having thought the judicial system failed the families of Nicole Brown Simpson and Ron Goldman—as well as his own family after his daughter's murder—he was personally vested in Simpson's fate.

Dunne's adventures in Hollywood were described in the documentary film Dominick Dunne: After the Party (2008), directed by Kirsty de Garis and Timothy Jolley. The film documents his hardships and successes in the entertainment industry. In the film, Dunne reflects on his past as a World War II veteran, falling in love and raising a family, his climb and fall as a Hollywood producer, and his comeback as a writer. In 2002, director Barry Avrich released an unauthorized documentary about Dunne, Guilty Pleasure. It provides a more candid look at Dunne's life and includes those who took issue with his journalistic style. It was released globally and featured Johnnie Cochran, Griffin Dunne, and producer David Brown.

Final years and tribute
In September 2008, Dunne disclosed that he was being treated for bladder cancer. At the time of his death, he was working on Too Much Money. On September 22, 2008, Dunne complained of intense pain, and was taken by ambulance to Valley Hospital. He died on August 26, 2009, at his home in Manhattan and was buried at Cove Cemetery, in the shadow of Gillette Castle in Hadlyme, Connecticut.

On October 29, 2009 (what would have been Dunne's 84th birthday), many of his family and friends gathered at the Chateau Marmont to celebrate his life. Vanity Fair paid tribute to Dunne and his extensive contributions to the magazine in its November 2009 issue.

Family
Dunne was married to Ellen Beatriz Griffin from 1954 to 1965. He was the father of Alexander Dunne and the actors Griffin Dunne and Dominique Dunne, as well as two daughters who died in infancy.

Dominique Dunne, most known for her role in the film Poltergeist, was strangled to death by her ex-boyfriend, John Sweeney, on November 4, 1982. Dominick Dunne covered Sweeney's trial for Vanity Fair, and alongside the rest of his family, expressed his outrage when Sweeney was acquitted of second-degree murder in favor of voluntary manslaughter.

Bibliography
The Winners - (March 17, 1982). Simon & Schuster. 
The Two Mrs. Grenvilles - (January 2, 1986). Crown Publishing Group. 
Fatal Charms: And Other Tales of Today - (January 6, 1987). Crown Publishing Group. 
People Like Us - (May 28, 1988). Crown Publishing Group. 
An Inconvenient Woman - (May 19, 1990). Crown Publishers. 
The Mansions of Limbo - (July 30, 1991). Crown Publishers. 
A Season in Purgatory - (May 27, 1993). Bantam Press. 
Another City, Not My Own - (November 9, 1997) Crown Publishers.  
The Way We Lived Then: Recollections of a Well-known Name Dropper - (September 28, 1999). Crown Publishers. 
Justice: Crimes, Trials, And Punishments - (July 26, 2001). Crown Publishers. 
Too Much Money - (December 15, 2009). Ballantine Books.

Filmography

References

External links

Dominick Dunne, Chronicler of Crime, Dies at 83, The New York Times, August 26, 2009
Celebrity Author And Hartford Native Dominick Dunne Dies At Age 83". The Hartford Courant
Obituary – Star-Gazette
 Dominick Dunne – Daily Telegraph obituary

Dominick Dunne papers at the Briscoe Center for American History
 

1925 births
2009 deaths
American legal writers
20th-century American memoirists
20th-century American novelists
Bisexual men
American bisexual writers
Novelists from Connecticut
Novelists from New York (state)
Deaths from cancer in New York (state)
Deaths from bladder cancer
American people of Irish descent
Military personnel from Hartford, Connecticut
Writers from Hartford, Connecticut
People from West Hartford, Connecticut
Williams College alumni
United States Army personnel of World War II
21st-century American novelists
American male novelists
20th-century American male writers
21st-century American male writers
21st-century American non-fiction writers
American male non-fiction writers
Film producers from Connecticut
Canterbury School (Connecticut) alumni
LGBT people from Connecticut
LGBT people from New York (state)
20th-century LGBT people
21st-century LGBT people
American writers of Irish descent